Coming Down from Red Lodge is an album by American musician Peter Ostroushko, released in 2003.

All the songs were written for performance on A Prairie Home Companion. Guests include Pat Donohue and Greg Leisz.

Reception

Sing Out! stated in its Summer 2003 review: "Ostroushko, like Antonín Dvořák and Aaron Copland before him is able to grasp the kernel of music at the center of "the American experience", and transform it into a larger, more colorful whole... Coming Down from Red Lodge is destined to become one of Ostroushko's most popular recordings."

Writing for Allmusic, music critic Chris Nickson wrote the album is "a perfect illustration of his breadth and instrumental virtuosity on both fiddle and mandolin... The only track that doesn't really work is "Hymn: Page 9/11", perhaps because the emotions involved remain too fresh to be put into notes. With that caveat, this is one of Ostroushko's best releases — and that statement alone is no small praise, given his stature as one of the American greats."

Track listing 
All songs by Peter Ostroushko.
"Coming Down from Red Lodge" – 2:26
"(Peter's Most Excellent) Trip to Donegal" – 4:35
"Teelin Bay Waltz" – 3:29
"President George W. Bush's Hornpipe" – 2:30
"New Smyrna Serenade" – 3:50
"Cashdollar Blues" – 3:15
"East Texas Waltz" – 4:20
"Topanga Canyon Strut" – 4:30
"Reel Medley: The Four-Faced Liar/Baggett Street/The Witches' Kitchen" – 4:50
"Hymn: Page 9/11" – 4:42

Personnel
Peter Ostroushko – mandolin, fiddle, mandola
Marc Anderson – percussion
Gary Raynor	 – bass
Joel Sayles – bass
Andy Stein – fiddle, saxophone
Diane Tremaine – cello
Pat Donohue – guitar
Dirk Freymuth – bouzouki, guitar
Arnie Kinsella – drums, cowbell, percussion
Dan Newton – accordion
Greg Leisz – guitar, lap steel guitar

Production notes
Peter Ostroushko – producer, liner Notes, mixing
Eric Peltoniemi – executive producer
Rick Cunha – engineer
Sam Hudson – engineer, mixing
David Glasser – mastering
Carla Leighton – design
Ann Marsden – photography

References

2003 albums
Peter Ostroushko albums
Red House Records albums